Kime is a Japanese martial arts term.

Kime may also refer to:
Kime (surname)
Kime, Missouri, U.S. ghost town
Kime, complex time in physics